Valeri Vladimirovich Bogdanets (born 9 April 1960) is a Russian football manager and former player. He also holds Moldovan citizenship and his name in Moldovan is spelled Valeriu Bogdăneț.

Honours
Moldova Boroseni
Moldovan National Division bronze: 1992–93

References

1960 births
Sportspeople from Poltava
Living people
Soviet footballers
Ukrainian footballers
FC Vorskla Poltava players
FC Zimbru Chișinău players
CS Tiligul-Tiras Tiraspol players
Moldovan footballers
Russian football managers
Speranța Nisporeni players
Association football midfielders
FC Iskra Smolensk players